Anton-Hermann Chroust (29 January 1907 – January 1982) was a German-American jurist, philosopher and historian, from 1946 to 1972, professor of law, philosophy, and history, at the University of Notre Dame. Chroust was best known for his 1965 bookThe Rise of the Legal Profession in America.

Chroust was born on January 28, 1907, in Wurzburg, Germany, the son of Johanna and Anton Julius Chroust, an Austrian-born professor of German history at the University of Wurzburg.

Anton-Hermann Chroust earned a bachelor's degree from the University of Wurzberg in 1925, a law degree from the University of Erlangen in 1929, and a doctorate from the University of Munich in 1931 .

He arrived in the United States in September 1932 to study for an advanced law degree at Harvard Law School. Chroust finished his academic work at Harvard in 1933, earning a doctorate in juridical science, Harvard's most advanced law degree. Although not on the Harvard payroll, Chroust then served as a special assistant to Harvard Law Dean Nathan Roscoe Pound until 1941, while at the same time applying for academic positions at universities across the United States.

On December 9, 1941—two days after the Japanese bombed Pearl Harbor—FBI agents arrived at Chroust's rooming house in Boston and took him into custody as an enemy alien who was suspected of sympathy with the Nazi Party and possibly working for Nazi Germany. The federal government case listed at least fourteen informants, including members of the Harvard faculty. Chroust was strongly defended by his friend, Harvard Law School dean Roscoe Pound.

German records identify Chroust as a member of the Nazi Party as late as July 15, 1939. In March 1943, Chroust was released on parole with Pound designated as his parole sponsor. In 1945 Chroust was again detained by the U.S. authorities, was released on parole on February 23, 1946, but faced possible deportation.

Chroust joined faculty of the University of Notre Dame in the summer of 1946 after being recommended by Pound.

On March 29, 1941, Chroust married Elisabeth Redmond of Brookline, Massachusetts. The couple separated in 1946 and divorced in 1950.

Chroust became a naturalized U.S. citizen on February 7, 1951, at a ceremony in South Bend, with Pound serving as his sponsor.

Chroust retired from the full-time faculty at Notre Dame in 1972 and died on January 11, 1982, in South Bend, Indiana. He is buried at Cedar Grove Cemetery at the University of Notre Dame.

Notable works
 The Corporate Idea and the Body Politic in the Middle Ages (1947)
 Socrates, Man and Myth: The Two Socratic apologies of Xenophon (1957)
 Protrepticus: A Reconstruction (1964)
 The Rise of the Legal Profession in America (1965)
 Aristotle: New Light on His Life and on Some of His Lost Works (1973)
 Aristotle: Some Novel Interpretations of the Man and His Life (1973)

Bibliography
1942
 

1944
 
 

1945 
 
 
 
 

1946
 

1947
 
 
 
 
 

1948
 
 

1949
 
 

1950
 
 
 

1951 
 
 

1952
 
 
 

1953
 

1954
 
 

1957
 
 
 

1958
 

1960
 
 

1961
 
 
 

1962
 
 

1963
 

1964
 
 
 
 
 

1965
 
 
 
 
 
 
 
 
 

1966
 
 
 
 
 

1967
 
 
 
 

1968
 
 
 

1972
 
 
 
 

1973
 
 
 
 
 
 

1974
 

1975
 
 
 

1977
 

1978
 

1979
 

1980
 

2008
 

2011

References

German emigrants to the United States
University of Notre Dame faculty
Notre Dame Law School faculty
1907 births
1982 deaths
University of Würzburg alumni
University of Erlangen-Nuremberg alumni
Ludwig Maximilian University of Munich alumni
Harvard Law School alumni